Maagoe Peak is a peak,  high, at the north end of the Gifford Peaks in the Heritage Range of the Ellsworth Mountains, Antarctica. It was mapped by the United States Geological Survey from ground surveys and U.S. Navy air photos from 1961 to 1966, and was named by the Advisory Committee on Antarctic Names for Steffen Maagoe, an ionospheric scientist at Eights Station in 1964.

See also
 Mountains in Antarctica

References

Ellsworth Mountains
Mountains of Ellsworth Land